Carmen Bourassa (1942 – 25 December 2021) was a Canadian television producer.

Life and career
Bourassa was born the oldest of seven children in Trois-Rivières in 1942. She attended the École normale du Christ-Roi and began working for the Ministry of Education and Higher Education of Quebec. There, she led the movement to allow educational television programs for children in schools.

In 2009, she explained to Le Nouvelliste that the series which she produced centered around childhood education. Her later series included  on Télé-Québec from 1992 to 1995,  on Télé-Quebec from 1993 to 1996, and Toc toc toc on Radio-Canada since 2007. She also produced multiple series for Telefiction.

Bourassa died on 25 December 2021, at the age of 79.

Filmography
Passe-Partout (1977–1991)
Zap (1993–1996)
 (1996–2000)
 (1999–2003)
 (2001–2003)
Toc toc toc (2007–2014)
1, 2, 3 Géants (2014–2021)
 (2015–2021)

Awards
Prix Gémeaux
Grand Prize of the Academy of Canadian Cinema & Television (2009)

References

External links
 
 

1942 births
2021 deaths
French Quebecers
Canadian television producers
People from Trois-Rivières
Canadian women television producers